Iskandar Beg Munshi, a.k.a. Iskandar Beg Turkman ( – c. 1632), was a Persian historian of Turkoman origin of the Safavid emperor Shah Abbas I.  Iskandar Beg began as an accountant in the bureaucracy, but later became a privileged secretary of the Shahs.  He wrote one of the greatest works of Persian historiography, Tārīk̲h̲-i ʿĀlam-ārā-yi ʿAbbāsī (Alamara-i Abbasi). The work begins with the origins of the Safavids and continues through the reign of Shah Abbas I. His native language was Azerbaijani.

References

16th-century Iranian historians
17th-century Iranian historians
Safavid historians
Iranian historians of Islam
16th-century writers of Safavid Iran
17th-century writers of Safavid Iran